The 2006-07 Los Angeles Clippers season was their 37th season in the NBA and their 23rd in Los Angeles.

Draft picks

Roster

Regular season

Season standings

Record vs. opponents

Game log

Player statistics

Regular season 

|-
| 
| 80 || style=";"| 80 || style=";"| 38.5 || .533 ||  style=";"| 1.000 || .761 || style=";"| 9.3 || 2.9 || 1.0 || style=";"| 2.2 || style=";"| 20.5
|-
| 
| 58 || 30 || 24.3 || .418 || .294 || .879 || 2.9 || style=";"| 4.7 || .5 || .1 || 12.3
|-
| 
| 7 || 0 || 11.7 || .294 || .167 || .667 || 1.6 || 1.1 || .4 || .1 || 1.9
|-
| 
| 4 || 0 || 8.8 || .000 || . || .000 || 1.3 || 2.0 || .0 || .0 || .0
|-
| 
| 31 || 0 || 5.8 || .423 || . || .700 || 1.4 || .2 || .2 || .2 || 1.6
|-
| 
| 61 || 3 || 11.7 || .404 || .318 || .778 || 1.2 || 1.5 || .5 || .1 || 2.9
|-
| 
| 23 || 22 || 32.4 || .438 || .174 || style=";"| .889 || 3.6 || 4.0 || style=";"| 1.8 || .0 || 9.0
|-
| 
| 3 || 0 || 5.3 || .125 || .250 || . || .3 || 1.3 || .0 || .0 || 1.0
|-
| 
| 75 || 66 || 29.0 || .451 || .000 || .741 || 7.8 || 1.1 || .5 || 1.5 || 10.1
|-
| 
| 10 || 0 || 4.1 || .250 || .200 || .500 || .3 || .4 || .3 || .0 || 1.2
|-
| 
| 54 || 31 || 29.8 || .463 || .313 || .707 || 3.4 || style=";"| 5.1 || 1.1 || .5 || 9.3
|-
| 
| 75 || 31 || 30.5 || .454 || .200 || .820 || 5.9 || 2.8 || .9 || .2 || 16.9
|-
| 
| 78 || 73 || 36.4 || .440 || .411 || .837 || 3.4 || 2.5 || 1.2 || .3 || 13.8
|-
| 
| style=";"| 81 || 43 || 21.0 || .467 || .200 || .782 || 2.3 || 1.1 || .9 || .4 || 5.2
|-
| 
| 53 || 0 || 7.1 || .366 || .214 || .759 || 2.0 || .3 || .3 || .3 || 1.6
|-
| 
| 76 || 24 || 27.0 || .414 || .382 || .708 || 5.0 || 2.3 || .7 || .4 || 11.0
|-
| 
| 1 || 0 || 1.0 || .000 || .000 || . || .0 || .0 || .0 || .0 || .0
|-
| 
| 38 || 7 || 9.8 || style=";"| .547 || .000 || .818 || 2.2 || .2 || .2 || .4 || 2.0
|-
| 
| 2 || 0 || 5.0 || .000 || .000 || .500 || .5 || 1.5 || 1.0 || .0 || 1.0
|}

Awards and records

Transactions

Trades
No trades occurred for this team.

Free agents

Re-signed

Additions

Subtractions

References

See also
 2006-07 NBA season

Los Angeles Clippers seasons